Kellinghusen is an Amt ("collective municipality") in the district of Steinburg, in Schleswig-Holstein, Germany. Its seat is in Kellinghusen and in the Amt is situated the lesser-populated settlement of the nation, Wiedenborstel.

History
Before 1 January 2008, when it was joined by the (previously Amt-free) town Kellinghusen and the municipalities Hohenlockstedt and Lockstedt from the former Amt Hohenlockstedt, it was named Kellinghusen-Land.

Subdivision
The Amt Kellinghusen consists of the following municipalities (population in 2005 between brackets):

Brokstedt (2,194)
Fitzbek (386)
Hennstedt (589)
Hingstheide (68)
Hohenlockstedt (6,175) 
Kellinghusen (7,934) [town]
Lockstedt (173)
Mühlenbarbek (335)
Oeschebüttel (204)
Poyenberg (410)
Quarnstedt (437)
Rade (95)
Rosdorf (383)
Sarlhusen (509)
Störkathen (108)
Wiedenborstel (5)
Willenscharen (158)
Wrist (2,514)
Wulfsmoor (382)

References

External links
 Amt Kellinghausen official site

Ämter in Schleswig-Holstein